The Heavenly Quran, according to a common Islamic belief, is a primordial version of the revealed Quran.

History 
The idea of a holy book or other religious totem being based on an archetype preserved in heaven is not unique to Islam but goes back "thousands of years" to "the early Summerians" according to Alfred Guillaume.

In the revealed Quran 
Revelation of the Quran is described as being "sent down" in verse :

It is also called kalam allah — the word of God — and to most Muslims is eternal and uncreated attribute of God, as opposed to something written or created by God.
The Quran that resides in heaven is distinct from the earthly Quran. It is disputed whether the revealed Quran is a precise copy of the Heavenly Quran or an abridged version. Commonly, Injil and the Islamic notion of Torah are thought to be part of the Heavenly Quran.

References

Citations

Books, articles, etc.
 

Quran
Islamic mythology
Jannah